Giles William Goddard (born 22 June 1962 in England) is a British Church of England priest. He is Vicar of St John's Church, Waterloo.

Early life
Goddard studied theology at Clare College, Cambridge, and graduated from the University of Cambridge with a Bachelor of Arts (BA) degree in 1984; as per tradition, this was later promoted to a Master of Arts (MA (Cantab)) degree.

He then worked at John Lewis Plc. In 1988 he joined the Housing Corporation, the government agency then responsible for funding social housing. He became Development Director for ASRA Housing Association in 1989, before joining the newly formed Southwark and London Diocesan Housing Association in 1991 as its founding Director, until he was ordained.

Ordained ministry
Goddard was ordained in the Church of England as a deacon in 1995 and as a priest in 1996. He became Curate at St Faith's, North Dulwich.  In 1998 he became Rector of St Peter's Church, Walworth, where in 2003 he set up InSpire, a centre for learning, arts and community. From 2003 - 2008 he was Area Dean of Southwark & Newington. On 1 September 2009, he was officially welcomed as Priest-in-Charge of St John's Church, Waterloo. In 2014, he was made Vicar of the parish.

Goddard is co-founder of Faith for the Climate, the interfaith environmental action group.  He is also a member of the Church of England's General Synod. In 2014, he presented a motion to the General Synod, calling for leadership on the issue of climate change. The Synod voted overwhelmingly in favour of the motion. Goddard said: 'This vote proves that there is a hunger for us to do more on climate change as a church. But this is not the end, it's the beginning.'

A board member of Inclusive Church, Goddard is a member of the General Synod Human Sexuality Group and working to ensure full inclusion of LGBT people in the Church of England. He appeared in a Channel 4 documentary  that considered the question of gay vicars and as a vicar in a short film called "Getting In".   In October 2007, Giles was made an honorary Canon of Southwark Cathedral, along with four other clergy members from the Diocese of Southwark.

His first book,  'Space for Grace - Creating Inclusive Churches', was published by Canterbury Press in 2008.

In March 2015 Goddard was obliged to apologise for inviting Muslims to conduct Muslim prayers in St John's Waterloo an action that caused national controversy.

References

External links 
  St John with St Andrew Waterloo website
 St. Peter's profile on "a church near you" 
 

1962 births
Living people
21st-century English Anglican priests
Alumni of Clare College, Cambridge
20th-century English Anglican priests
Church of England priests